Sachin Debbarman Memorial Government Music College, Agartala, is a general degree music college in Agartala, Tripura. It offers different courses in music. It is affiliated to  Tripura University. 
The college is recognized by the University Grants Commission (UGC).

See also
Education in India
Education in Tripura
Tripura University
Literacy in India
List of institutions of higher education in Tripura

References

External links
https://sdmgovtmusiccollege.in/

Colleges affiliated to Tripura University
Universities and colleges in Tripura
Colleges in Tripura